Concubine Cheng (died 29 May 1784), of the Manchu Plain Red Banner Niohuru clan, was a consort of Qianlong Emperor.

Life

Family background 
Concubine Cheng was a member of Manchu Plain Red Banner Niohuru clan.

 Father: Mukedeng (穆克登), a second class imperial guard and a commander of Niru

 Paternal grandfather: A'ersong'a (阿尔松阿), Alingga's son and Ebilun's grandson, held a title of second-class duke (二等公)

Qianlong era 
Lady Niohuru entered the Forbidden City as "Noble Lady Lan" ("lan" meaning "orchid") in 1757. Her residence in the Forbidden City was Yongshou palace. She lived under the supervision of Consort Shu. In 1759, Lady Niohuru punished a eunuch who stole her clothes and sold them; a common practice in the Imperial Palace. The servant was exiled to Ningguta. After the incident, she was demoted to "First Class Female Attendant Lan". In 1768, she was restored as "Noble Lady Lan". In 1777, Lady Niohuru was promoted to "Concubine Cheng" ("cheng" meaning "sincere"), but the ceremony was delayed until 1779 because of the mourning period after Empress Xiaoshengxian. She began to live together with Noble Lady Shun. Concubine Cheng died on 29 May 1784 during Qianlong Emperor's southern tour. She was interred in Yu mausoleum in the Eastern Qing tombs.

Titles 
 During the reign of the Qianlong Emperor (r. 1735–1796):
 Lady Niohuru (from unknown date)
 Noble Lady Lan (from 1757), sixth rank consort
 First Class Female Attendant Lan (from 1758), seventh rank consort
 Noble Lady Lan (from 1768), sixth rank consort
 Concubine Cheng (from 1777), fifth rank consort

See also
 Ranks of imperial consorts in China#Qing
 Royal and noble ranks of the Qing dynasty

References 

1784 deaths
18th-century Chinese women
Consorts of the Qianlong Emperor